The 2000 Queensland Cup season was the 5th season of Queensland's top-level statewide rugby league competition run by the Queensland Rugby League. The competition, known as the Bundy Gold Cup due to sponsorship from Bundaberg Rum, featured 12 teams playing a 26-week long season (including finals) from February to August.

The Redcliffe Dolphins defeated the Toowoomba Clydesdales 14–6 in the grand final at Suncorp Stadium to claim their second premiership. Wests Panthers  Jason Bulgarelli was named the competition's Player of the Year.

Teams 
For the first time, the competition featured the same 12 teams that participated the year before. The Central Capras re-branded as the Central Comets and changed their colour scheme to avoid confusion with the region's representative side.

For the 2000 season, the Brisbane Broncos and Melbourne Storm were again affiliated with the Toowoomba Clydesdales and Norths Devils, respectively. After using Souths Magpies and Wynnum Seagulls as feeders clubs in 1999, the Auckland Warriors used Souths as their sole feeder. The North Queensland Cowboys did not use Cairns as their affiliate club, instead using their own team in the NSWRL's First Division competition.

Ladder

Finals series

Grand final 

Toowoomba, who finished the regular season in third, qualified for their second grand final after defeating Redcliffe in their major semi-final. Redcliffe won their second straight minor premiership and once again earned a first week bye. After losing to Toowoomba they defeated Easts by 34 points in the preliminary final to set up a 1996 grand final rematch with the Clydesdales. In the regular season, the Dolphins defeated the Clydesdales in both of their meetings.

First half 
Redcliffe winger Trent Leis opened the scoring in the 16th minute when he crossed out wide. In doing so, he became the first player to score in back-to-back grand finals. Four minutes later, the Dolphins pushed their lead to eight when prop Troy Lindsay barged over the try line. Toowoomba would finally get on the board with one minute left to play in the first when Justin Hodges stepped through a number of defenders to score under the posts.

Second half 
The Dolphins regained an eight-point lead four minutes into the second half when their captain Craig O'Dwyer threw a dummy close to the line and darted over. The try would be the last points scored in the game as Redcliffe held on to become the first club to win two grand finals.

Redcliffe players Adam Mogg, George Wilson, Tony Gould, Troy Lindsay, James Hinchey and Russell Lahiff became the first players to win two grand finals with the same club, having all been involved in Redcliffe's 1997 triumph. Craig O'Dwyer became the second player (after Aaron Douglas a year earlier) to win two grand finals with two different clubs, winning his first with Norths in 1998.

Player statistics

Leading try scorers

Leading point scorers

End-of-season awards 
 Courier Mail Medal: Jason Bulgarelli ( Wests Panthers)
 Rookie of the Year: Brook Martin ( Easts Tigers)

See also 

 Queensland Cup
 Queensland Rugby League

References 

2000 in Australian rugby league
Queensland Cup